The 2002 Formula BMW ADAC season was a multi-event motor racing championship for open wheel, formula racing cars held across Europe. The championship featured drivers competing in 1.2 litre Formula BMW single seat race cars. The 2002 season was the fifth Formula BMW ADAC season organized by BMW Motorsport and ADAC. The season began at Hockenheimring on 20 April and finished at the same place on 6 October, after twenty races. Nico Rosberg was crowned series champion.

Driver lineup

2002 Schedule
The series supported the Deutsche Tourenwagen Masters at nine rounds, with additional round at the European Grand Prix on 22–23 June.

Season standings

Drivers Standings
Points are awarded as follows:

Notes

References

External links
 Formula BMW ADAC 2002 on adac-motorsport.de
 2002 Formula BMW ADAC statistics on Driver Database

Formula BMW seasons
Formula BMW ADAC
BMW ADAC